Aghu Tharrnggala is an extinct Paman language of the Cape York Peninsula in Queensland, Australia. Like several languages in the area, it is often referred to as Gogo Mini (Kuku-Mini) 'good speech'. Some sources treat Ikarranggali, and Alngula (Alungul) as synonyms. However, they are distinct languages.

Aghu Tharrnggala is demonstrably related to Kuku-Thaypan. The two may also have been related to Takalak, although there is insufficient information for this to be certain.

References

Bibliography

Thaypan languages
Extinct languages of Queensland